Arthur Robert Wiecinski (born 1991) is a Polish Archbishop, prime bishop of the Old Catholic Church in Poland since 14  January 2017, having been elected at the General Synod of the church. He was also Primate of the Polish-Catholic Church in United Kingdom in from April 2018 to May 2019.

See also
 Old Catholic
 Polish Old Catholicism

References

External links

1991 births
Polish Old Catholic bishops
Clergy from Warsaw
Living people